Alan I may refer to:

 Alan I, King of Brittany (died 907)
 Alan I, Viscount of Rohan (1084–1147)